Big Brother Brasil 3 was the third season of Big Brother Brasil which premiered January 14, 2003 on the Rede Globo.

The show was produced by Endemol Globo and presented by Pedro Bial. The season was officially confirmed since 2001 as part of the original contract between international Endemol and Rede Globo that provided seasons until 2008.

The grand prize was R$500.000 without tax allowances, with a R$50.000 prize offered to the runner-up and a R$30.000 prize offered to the housemate in third place.

The winner was 31-year-old congressional aide Dhomini Ferreira from Goiânia, Goiás.

Overview
There were fourteen Housemates competing for the grand prize, an increase over the two previous seasons. The season lasted 78 days, an increase of one week over the previous season. This season introduced the Power of Immunity.

Controversy
Among the contestants was the Miss Brasil 2002, Joseane Oliveira. Rules of the Miss Brasil contest forbid participation of married women, and when Joseane participated, she stated she was single. Due to the overexposition in the BBB, some magazines discovered she was married since before winning the beauty contest. The marriage being proved, Joseane was stripped of her crown, and Thaisa Tomsem was crowned Miss Brasil 2002.

Also, contestant Dilson, not knowing Joseane was married, tried to start a romantic relationship with her during the show. Due to her refusals, he felt unmotivated and left the show voluntarily. Harry replaced him at January 26, and became the first contestant not to enter the show at the first day.

Reunion show
The reunion was hosted by Pedro Bial and aired on April 6, 2003. All the former housemates, except Dilson, attended. Alan ended up winning the "Big Boss Prize" which awarded R$50.000 over Andrea with 86% of the fans' vote.

Housemates
(ages stated at time of contest)

Future appearances
In 2010, Joseane Oliveira returned to compete in Big Brother Brasil 10, she finished in 17th place in the competition.

In 2013, Dhomini Ferreira, the winner from this season, returned to compete in Big Brother Brasil 13, he finished in 15th place in the competition.

In 2020, Dhomini Ferreira, appeared to compete in Made In Japão, he finished in a joint 7th place in the competition, Sabrina Sato was the show host.

In 2023, Juliana Alves appeared in Dança dos Famosos 20, she still in the competition.

Voting history

Notes

References

External links
 Big Brother Brasil 3
 Terra: BBB3

2003 Brazilian television seasons
03